AKDN may refer to:
Acadiana Railway, a short line railroad based in Opelousas, Louisiana, United States
Aga Khan Development Network, a multinational network of development agencies for humanity